Crickhowell (non-standard spelling ) is a  town and community in southeastern Powys, Wales, near Abergavenny, and is in the historic county of Brecknockshire.

Location

The town lies on the River Usk, on the southern edge of the Black Mountains and in the eastern part of the Brecon Beacons National Park.

Etymology and language
The name Crickhowell is an anglicised spelling that corresponds to the Welsh Crucywel. The name is derived from Crug Hywel, meaning 'Hywel's mound'. This is usually identified with the Iron Age hill fort on nearby Table Mountain, although this has the local name of Mynydd y Begwn. It may be that Crug Hywel refers to the castle mound in the town itself. The language of Crickhowell (and Llangynidr) was originally Welsh. In his 1893 book Wales and her language, John E. Southall, reports that over 60% of the population of Crickhowell spoke Welsh, although the town was only a few miles from more anglicised Abergavenny.

The town

Public services in Crickhowell are provided by Powys County Council and to a lesser extent by Crickhowell Town Council. Planning matters fall to the Brecon Beacons National Park Authority. There is a  primary school and a secondary school; both act as a central point for a large catchment area. There is some light industry on the outskirts of Crickhowell at the Elvicta Industrial Estate. The town centre includes a variety of traditional businesses, many of which are family owned. Other facilities in Crickhowell include a library, two play areas, public toilets and the CRiC building, which houses a tourist information centre, an internet cafe, an art gallery and a local history archive. There are pubs, cafes, restaurants and two hotels: "The Bear" and "The Dragon".

The churches in Crickhowell include St Edmund's Church which holds a service every Sunday, Crickhowell Evangelical Church, a Baptist church and a Catholic church.

In 2015, Crickhowell appeared in a TV documentary, claiming it as the first British settlement to purposely use similar tax avoidance tactics used by multinational businesses to avoid paying taxes themselves, in protest at the way large corporations use legal loopholes to avoid paying UK corporation tax.

A market and fair have been recorded since 1281.

Governance
An electoral ward in the same name exists. This ward includes The Vale of Grwyney community and has a total population of 2,801 as of the 2011 census. The current councillor is John Morris, a Liberal Democrat.

Tourism
Today, Crickhowell is a popular tourist destination. In 2005 a tourist information centre was built in the centre of town and during summer the town is notably busier. Many people visit Crickhowell to see the Black Mountains and the Brecon Beacons, and perhaps to enjoy some mountain-biking, camping, hillwalking, rock climbing, fly-fishing, hang-gliding or caravanning, or simply to tour the area by car, staying in bed-and-breakfast accommodation. The Green Man Festival takes place annually in mid-August at nearby Glanusk Park.

Notable buildings

Notable features in Crickhowell include the seventeenth-century stone bridge over the River Usk with its odd arches (twelve on one side, thirteen on the other) and its seat built into the walls, the 14th-century parish church of St Edmund, and the ruins of Crickhowell Castle on the green "tump" set back from the A40 Brecon to Abergavenny road.

Market Hall
Crickhowell Market Hall (originally the Town Hall) on The Square dates from 1834, nowadays with market stalls on the ground floor and a cafe in the first floor old courtroom. In 2007 Powys County Council handed over responsibility of the hall to a charity, the Market Hall Trust. The stone building, raised on twin doric columns, is Grade II* listed.

Schools
Crickhowell has two schools: Crickhowell Community Primary School and a secondary school, Crickhowell High School.

Notable people

 Watkin Herbert (ca.1517 – ca.1564), a politician and MP for Breconshire in 1558.
 Admiral John Gell (1740–1806), a commander in the Royal Navy for 30 years, died locally.
 Colonel Sir George Everest CB FRS FRAS FRGS (1790–1866), eponymn for Mount Everest. Surveyor and geographer, served as Surveyor General of India from 1830 to 1843. His father had an estate nearby called "Gwernvale Manor".
 Admiral Sir Walter Cowan, 1st Baronet KCB, DSO & Bar, MVO (1871–1956), a Royal Navy officer in both World Wars
 Nicholas Edwards, Baron Crickhowell PC (1934–2018), politician and MP for Pembrokeshire from 1970 until 1987 and Secretary of State for Wales 
 Sir Roderic Llewellyn, 5th Baronet (born 1947), baronet, garden designer, journalist, author, and TV presenter. 
 Roger Williams CBE (born 1948), politician and MP for Brecon and Radnorshire from 2001 to 2015.
 Martyn Farr (born 1951), exploratory cave diver and caver
 Mark Wyatt (born 1957), played 10 games for Wales national rugby union team
 Tiggy Legge-Bourke (born 1965), former royal nanny. Her childhood home was Glanusk Park estate. She still lives near the town as proprietor of Tŷ'r Chanter bed and breakfast lodgings.

Golf course

The former Crickhowell & Penmyarth Golf Club was founded in 1897 and played on a course at Glanusk Park. The club and course disappeared in the late 1960s.

Surrounding villages
 Cwmdu
 Glangrwyney
 Llanbedr
 Llangattock
 Llangenny
 Llangynidr
 Tretower Tretower Castle and Tretower Court, a manor house still in very good condition

Cwrt y Gollen, a British Army training base, is near Crickhowell.

References

External links

Crickhowell visitor website
David John Addis BBC feature on Crickhowell castle
Photos of Crickhowell and surrounding area on geograph.org.uk

 
Towns in Powys
Communities in Powys
Black Mountains, Wales
River Usk